The Opawica River is a tributary of the Waswanipi River, which is a tributary of Matagami Lake which in turn flows into the Nottaway River which flows into the south of James Bay. The Opawica River flows in the municipality of Eeyou Istchee Baie-James (municipality), in the administrative region of Nord-du-Québec, in Quebec, the Canada.

Forestry is the main economic activity of the sector. Recreational tourism activities come second, thanks to this large navigable waterway.

The northern and western portions of the Lake Opawica watershed are accessible via the forest road route 113 linking Chibougamau to Lebel-sur-Quévillon. A forest road serving the southern, eastern and northern shores of Opawica and Wachigabau lakes connects via the north to route 113. The western side of the slope is also accessible through the Canadian National Railway passing between these two lakes. The intermediate part of the slope is accessible by the forest road R1051 (coming from the North). The upper part of the river is mostly accessible by the road R1032 (coming from the South).

The surface of the Opawica River is usually frozen from early November to mid-May, however, safe ice movement is generally from mid-November to mid-April.

Geography

Toponymy
The term "Opawica" is associated with the lake, the island and the river.

The toponym "Opawica River" was formalized on December 5, 1968, at the Bank of Place Names of the Commission de toponymie du Québec.

Notes and references

See also 

Rivers of Nord-du-Québec
Nottaway River drainage basin
Eeyou Istchee James Bay
Jamésie